Stav Beger (born 21 October 1991) is an Israeli record producer, arranger, composer, songwriter and artistic director.

Career 
At his career's beginning, Beger worked as recording engineer for Israeli musician Yinon Yahel. In 2015 he helped him to produce Israel's Eurovision 2015 song "Golden Boy". Starting his independent career as a record producer and composer, Beger produced Israeli rapper Talisman's hit "Zanzibar" in 2016, which reached the top of Galgalatz's weekly chart.

In 2018, he wrote and produced Omer Adam's biggest hit "Shney Meshugaim", which reached the top of Media Forest's chart and got more than 7 million streams on Spotify, becoming the most-streamed Hebrew song on the platform. At the same year, Beger wrote and produce Israel's 2018 Eurovision-winning song by Netta Barzilai, "Toy", with Doron Medalie, winning Society of Authors, Composers and Music Publishers in Israel prizes for "extraordinary achievement in the international arena" and "arranger of the year".

In 2019, Beger co-wrote the songs "Bassa Sababa" and "Nana Banana" by Netta Barzilai. At the same year, he produced "Katov Mi'lemala" by Idan Raichel, which reached the top of Media Forest's weekly chart.

In 2020, he wrote with Nathan Goshen the song "Roots" by Eden Alene, one of the four nominated songs to represent Israel in the Eurovision Song Contest 2020. At the same year, he produced Goshen's sixth album, Bati Lachlom, which got many praises.

References 

1991 births
Living people
Jewish Israeli musicians
Israeli record producers
Israeli male songwriters
Eurovision Song Contest winners